William Potter Gale (1916-1988) was a political activist who was involved with several white supremacist groups, including Christian Identity and the Posse Comitatus. He was tied to the Aryan Nations, the Church of Jesus Christ–Christian, the Sovereign citizen movement, and the Militia Movement.

Early life and career 
William Potter Gale was born on November 20, 1916, the fourth of five children of Charles Gale and Mary Agnes Potter. He was named after his maternal grandfather, William Potter; His father was raised as a Jew but rejected Judaism. Potter's father Charles was descended from a long line of religiously devout Jews. Charles Gale arrived in the United States in 1894, fleeing from the antisemitic pogroms and the economic instability which were occurring in the Russian Empire, changing his family's name from "Grabifker" to Gale. At the age of 18, Charles Gale lied about his age and place of birth in order to serve in the US Army, but he truthfully listed his ethnicity as "Hebrew" on his military enlistment papers. Charles abandoned Judaism, married a non-Jewish woman, and raised their children as Christians. Charles Gale's siblings continued to practice Judaism.

An Army Lieutenant Colonel, William Potter Gale served on General Douglas MacArthur's staff during World War II. After leaving the army, Gale became an Episcopalian minister, but he eventually founded his own church. He also joined the John Birch Society.

In 1964, he opened a securities firm in Glendale, California, and ran in the GOP primary for the 27th Congressional District without success.

Activities and affiliations 
Along with associates, Gale founded the California Rangers in the 1960s. The Rangers were registered as a civil defense group, although the Anti Defamation League (ADL) has listed them as a paramilitary tax resistance group. According to his own account, he was involved in the founding of the Christian Defense League (CDL) along with S.J. Capt sometime between 1957 and 1962.

Having been introduced to Wesley Swift by S.J. Capt in 1956, Gale was involved in Swift's Church of Jesus Christ, Christian along with recognizable Christian Identity figures like Bertrand Comperet and Richard Girnt Butler. Swift ordained Gale as a Christian Identity minister that same year. Michael Barkun refers to Gale as "a major Identity figure, part of the Comparet-Swift-Gale triumvirate that defined Christian Identity in California." Following Swift's death in 1970, Gale turned from advocate to enemy, attacking Swift and his followers in his writings and publications. 

Gale has been described as the founder of the Posse Comitatus movement.  Barkun states that although the Posse Comitatus was not specifically an Identity movement, there were prominent Identity figures who were associated with it. Gale founded the United States Christian Posse Associates as an offshoot of his Ministry of Christ church. He was one of the founders of the Christian Patriot movement in the 1980s.

On October 2, 1987, Gale was convicted of tax related crimes and sent to prison. While his appeal was pending, he died on April 28, 1988.

References 

1916 births
1988 deaths
American people of Russian-Jewish descent
Aryan Nations
Christian Identity
American white supremacists
California Republicans
Sovereign citizen movement individuals
John Birch Society members